Ryazan is the largest city and administrative center of Ryazan Oblast, Russia. As of the 2010 Census, Ryazan had a population of 524,927, making it the 33rd most populated city in Russia, and the fourth most populated in Central Russia after Moscow, Voronezh, and Yaroslavl.

Ryazan was previously known as Pereyaslavl-Ryazansky until 1778, where it became the new capital of the Principality of Ryazan following the Mongol invasion of Kievan Rus'.

The city is known for the Ryazan Kremlin, a historic museum; the Pozhalostin Museum, one of the oldest art museums in Russia; the Memorial Museum-Estate of Academician I.P. Pavlov; and the Ryazan Museum of Long-Range Aviation.

History

Principality of Ryazan 

The area of Ryazan was settled by Slavic tribes around the 6th century.

It is argued that the Ryazan kremlin was founded in 800, by Slavic settlers, as a part of their drive into territory previously populated by Volga Finnic peoples. Initially, it was built of wood, gradually replaced by masonry. The oldest preserved part of the Kremlin dates back to the 12th century.

However, the first written mention of the city, under the name of Pereslavl, dates to 1095. At that time, the city was part of the independent Principality of Ryazan, which had existed since 1078 and which was centered on the old city of Ryazan. The first ruler of Ryazan was supposedly Yaroslav Sviatoslavich, Prince of Ryazan and Murom (cities of Kievan Rus').

Invasion by Mongols 

In 12th century the lands of Ryazan being located on the border between woods and steppe suffered numerous invasions coming from the southern as northern parts of European Russia. The southern ones were usually carried out by military powers like Cumans, on the northern side, however, Ryazan was in a conflict with Vladimir-Suzdal duche who by end of the 12th century had burnt the capital of Ryazan several times already.

In the 13th century Ryazan was the first Russian city to face Mongolian invasion by hordes of Batu Khan. On December 21, 1237, after a short siege it was completely destroyed and never recovered. The site of the old capital now carries the name of Staraya Ryazan (Old Ryazan), close to Spassk-Ryazansky. Maps of the 16th-18th centuries show Ryazan (Old Ryazan) and Pereslavl-Ryazan together.

Golden horde 

In 1380, during the Battle of Kulikovo, the Grand Prince of Ryazan Oleg and his men came under a coalition of Mamai, a strongman of the Tatar Golden Horde, and the Grand Duke of Lithuania, against the armies under the command of the Grand Prince of Vladimir, Dmitry Donskoy.

Late in the 13th century, the Princes of Ryazan moved their capital to Pereyaslavl', which is known as Ryazan from the 16th century (officially renamed in 1778).

The principality was finally dissolved and incorporated into the Grand Duchy of Moscow in 1521. The principality's last duke Ivan V of Ryazan was imprisoned for a short time for being suspected in a treasonous attempt to seal a treaty with Crimean Khanate in order to outweigh Moscow's influence. The duke fled to the Grand Duchy of Lithuania where he died no later than 1534. 

Being the southernmost border of Rus' lands at the time, Ryazan continued to suffer from invasions of Crimean Tatars and their allies.

Grand Duchy of Moscow

Tsardom of Russia

Time of Troubles 

In June of 1605 Ryazan became a seat for Greek Cypriot-born Patriarch Ignatius, a clergyman who was sent by Russian Orthodox Church to serve as an archbishop of Ryazan. He was notorious for becoming the first church official to recognize a Poland-backed impostor False-Dmitry as a legitimate monarch, alleged Czar of Tsardom of Russia, after meeting with his forces in Tula.

Around that time Ryazan ex-duchy became a home for various noble families, most notable of which are Lyapunovs, whose brothers Prokopy and Zakhary Lyapunovs played a significant roles in shaping Russian history during Times of Troubles.

Soviet Union

During World War II, Ryazan was repeatedly bombed by German Luftwaffe. Immediately after the war, rapid development of the city began, and it became a major industrial, scientific, and military center of the European part of Russia. On October 19, 1960 a petroleum refinery produced its first gasoline.

Ryazan housed the USSR's only producer of potato-harvesting equipment at the time. Ryazselmash factory, an accounting machines plant, and a heavy forging equipment plant, among others, were also built.

Because of the city's industrialization, Ryazan Oblast's share of workers employed in the agrarian sector shifted into the industrial sector.

Ryazan was developed as a military center, and became the main training center of the Soviet Airborne Forces. Several positioned man-portable air-defense system protect the urban sky. Besides the Airborne School (at the time named after Kliment Voroshilov), Ryazan has the Automobile School and Institute of Communications, a regiment of railway troops, airbase strategic bombers, and a training center in Diaghilev.

Ryazan developed particularly rapidly while Nadezhda Nikolaevna Chumakova served as Chair of the Council of People's Deputies of Ryazan and Ryazan mayor. Under Chumakova, the city's population increased from 72,000 to 520,000. Chumakova oversaw the construction of social and cultural amenities, more than 20 urban areas, and hundreds of kilometers of trolleybus, tram and bus routes. Landscaping became a fundamental strategy for the development of the city at that time. A "green" ring of forests, parks, and garden associations surrounded Ryazan, with large parks located in each area of the city, and compositions of flowers and vertical gardening became customary, not only for the main streets, but also for industrial zones and factory buildings. Ryazan repeatedly won recognition among the cities of the Soviet Union for its landscaping. During her 26 years in office, Chumakova often accepted awards of the Red Banner of the USSR on behalf of Ryazan.

Post-Soviet period

By the time of the collapse of the Soviet Union, more than half of the city's GDP was being exported into its satellite states. In the 1990s, Ryazan experienced significant economic troubles as part of the 1998 Russian financial crisis, with many ex-Soviet and newly established companies going bankrupt by the end of the decade. In September 1999, Ryazan suffered a series of attempted apartment bombing (see Ryazan Incident below). 

As of 2001, Ryazan remained significantly influenced by its neighbor the Moscow Oblast, which exerted significant political and economic powers over it.

Culture

Architecture 
Ryazan's buildings are not characterized by any single architectural style. Many noted Russian architects worked in Ryazan, including Kazakov, who worked and died in this city, and built the house of Politech University. 

Ryazan's churches were built between the 15th and 19th centuries. Soviet Constructivism was an important step in Ryazan architecture.

Community
In 2006 and 2007, the Public Committee in Defense of the Historical and Architectural Museum "Ryazan Kremlin" campaigned against attempts by the Diocese of Voronezh to establish ownership over the Ryazan Kremlin.

A number of environmental groups are active in the city, campaigning for the removal of illegal landfills and volunteering for water area clean up. In 2019 and 2020, these groups organized and staged ecological pickets and protests.

Ryazan Cycling has built bike paths in the central parks of the city. This activity attracted the attention of the government, who promise to build several similar paths passing through the whole territory of Ryazan.

Religion
Ryazan is the seat of Diocese of Ryazan and Kasimov, an eparchy of the Russian Orthodox Church. Assumption Cathedral of the Ryazan Kremlin is one of the most important cathedrals in the city. Metropolia is the holder of the majority of religious temples in the city and the sole holder of the monasteries.

Believers is the cathedral church of All Who Sorrow Church. In addition, the city is home to a number of religious people, including Catholics, Lutherans, Baptists, Jehovah's Witnesses, Pentecostals, Seventh-day Adventists, Mormons, Charismatics and Muhtasibat Muslims, who built the Islamic Cultural Center.

Tourism
Ryazan is one of the leading tourist destinations in Central Russia. The Ryazan Kremlin is a symbol and the main landmark in Ryazan. It is an ensemble of the old main of Ryazan fortress (11 cen.), churches (15 - 20 cen.) and the Palace of Oleg. Sobornaia Bell is one of the highest bells of the Orthodox Church.

Ryazan State Museum of Art is one of the largest museums of Russian and European arts. It has paintings of F. Guardi, A. van Ostade, V. V. Kandinsky and others.

Geography

Environment 
As of 2021 an environmental pollution of air in the city remain relatively high. Excessive emissions of toxic fumes and gaseous substances such as sulfur dioxide (SO2) from neighbouring industries (i.e. oil refinery) located next to the city are often reported by local media. In December 2020 local government was trying to address the problem by finging local commercial organizations.

Climate
Ryazan has a humid continental climate (Köppen climate classification Dfb).

Government 

The Ryazan city governing body is divided among City's legislature (Ryazan City Duma), City administration and district's courts. 

Executive powers of the city are administered by a city governour, his advisers and deputies. Formal control over activities of authorities is exercised by the Public Chamber of the city of Ryazan, who work with youth involved in the headquarters of youth activists. 

The City Duma is a local parliament authorized to make city-wide laws. It's divided into sub-committees. 

Ryazan is also a system of community councils areas which are deliberative bodies coordinating the work of services housing and communal services and the Department of Public Works on urban areas.

Regional authorities 

The city also hosts different regional governing bodies: Ryazan Oblast Duma (regional parliament), Government and the Governor of the Ryazan Oblast. In two urban and one suburban residence being received at the highest level.

Administrative and municipal status

Ryazan is the administrative center of the oblast and, within the framework of administrative divisions, it also serves as the administrative center of Ryazansky District, even though it is not a part of it. As an administrative division, it is incorporated separately as the city of regional significance of Ryazan—an administrative unit with the status equal to that of the districts. As a municipal division, the city is incorporated as Ryazan Urban Circuit.

City districts 
The city of Ryazan is divided into four administrative districts:

 Moskovsky (North-Western)
 Oktyabrsky (Eastern) 
 Sovetsky, including a separate Solotcha district (North Eastern)
 Zheleznodorozhny (Southern)

Protests
In January 2021 the city saw a spike in protest activity. As many as 2000 people have participated in rallies in Ryazan alone as part of the 2021 Russian protests.

Education
Important educational institutions in the city include:

Ryazan State Radio Engineering University (RSREU)
The university studies mechanical and electrical engineering, software development and others fields.
As of 2016 RSRUE in a joint mission with EPAM offered free courses in software testing automation, front-end web software development (C# and .NET), and programming in JAVA. 
Higher Paratrooper Command Academy (HPCA), Russia state-run military school training officers for the airborne forces. Because of HPCA the city is often referred as the "paratrooper capital". In 2010 the institution discontinued enrollment to its paratrooping program, and now focuses on training professional sergeants for the armed forces.
Gorky Library serves Ryazan as well as Ryazan Oblast. It is the largest library in the region.
Ryazan State Medical University (RSMU)
Ryazan State University
Various technological colleges

Crime

90s gangs 

Ryazan, like many cities in Russia after the collapse of the Soviet Union, saw a rise in crime during the 1990s.  (Slony for short), one of the largest gangs in Russia, managed to monopolize the downtown area and the criminal underworld of Ryazan. The name is literally translated as «Elephants», after one of its leaders' height and power: Vyacheslav Ermolov Evgenievich (born 1962) nicknamed «Elephant». Before his criminal career started he was a taxi driver. The other leader was a personal driver of the vice prosecutor of the city.

In 1991, the gang became heavily involved in the racketeering of newly-privatized industries, motor vehicle sales, real estate, contract killings in other regions, participated in gang violence, kidnappings, and committed at least one armed attack on rivals which left 8 or 10 dead in November of 1993. 

According to Russian propaganda channel, NTV, the gang was linked to local authorities. By 1995, Slony managed to briefly seize control over almost the entire business community of Ryazan. This situation continued up until 1996 when local law enforcement managed to apprehend some suspects linked to the gang. By 2000 the gang was almost completely eliminated. Some members were either sentenced to jail or were on the run. One member of the group allegedly committed suicide in a detention center of Tolyatti in 2016 and another in Ryazan according to Russian sources. Slony's chief leader, Ermolov is still wanted as of August 2021.

In the same period, evidence was gathered against the former (4th) mayor and chairman of city duma, . Provotorova held powerful positions in the city for eight years, and, according to local authorities, was associated with the activities of the Slony gang.

By the 2018 many of Elephants served their prison terms and were freed. Some of members of the Osokyn's gang were sentenced up to 20 years in 2011. Its leader who is currently a fugitive was allegedly apprehended in 2016 by Ukrainian authorities in Ukraine.

Ryazan Incident 
In 1999 a group of allegedly plain-clothes FSB officers attempted to blow up a building on the East side of the city. The event is known as the Ryazan Incident.

2000s
Today, the crime rate in Ryazan is one of the lowest among the cities of the Central Federal District according to the Russian Interior Ministry. In the first six-months of 2012, 579.6 crimes were reported per hundred-thousand people, almost half the Central Federal District average of 839 reported crimes per hundred-thousand people. The low crime rate in Ryazan is often attributed to increased number of police patrols, high number of military schools, and voluntary militias headquarters distributed throughout the city's districts.

Economy

Major industry enterprises in the city include a military radio electronics production plant and an oil refinery (subsidiary of Rosneft, JSC Ryazan Oil Refining Company). The plant can refine 17 million metric tons of oil per year and is the city's largest employer. 

Around a quarter of the city's population works in the electronics industry. The most notable company in this sector is Plazma, which produces plasma screens for products including tanks and locomotives. In 1994, the company created a 50-50 research and development joint-venture with the South Korean company Orion PDP. In addition to plasma technology, Plazma produces LCD screens, industrial gas lasers and medical lasers. The company exports its products to the United States, China, and Israel, among others.

In 1993 software development company EPAM Systems entered the Ryazan market. As of 2016 it worked in joint venture with RSREU helping to teach students for free. 

In 2012 Russian search giant Yandex launched the 40MW data center in Sasovo; it is expected to accommodate 100,000 servers by 2019.

A steel casting company in the northwestern section of the city produces heavy steelworks and product, including industrial steel pipes for use in nuclear power plants. The plant employs a centrifugal casting method.

Public transportation 

Airports 
The Dyagilevo strategic bomber base is just west of the city, and the Alexandrovo air base is to the southeast, as is Turlatovo Airport.

Notable people

Arts
Alexander Alexandrov (1883–1946), composer
Erast Garin (1902–1980), comic actor
Alexander Genis (born 1953), writer, broadcaster and cultural critic
Yuri Kholopov (1932–2003), musicologist, music theorist, doctor of arts, and professor of the Moscow Conservatoire
Maximilian Kravkov (1887–1937), writer
Andrei Mironov (born 1975), painter
Konstantin Paustovsky (1892–1968), writer
Alexander Pirogov (1899–1964), bass opera singer
Yakov Polonsky (1819–1898), writer
Mikhail Saltykov-Shchedrin (1826–1889), satirist
Aleksandr Solzhenitsyn (1918–2008), writer
Sergei Yesenin (1895–1925), poet
Semen Zhivago (1807–1863), historical painter

Athletics
Anton Belov (born 1986), professional ice hockey defenceman
Olga Kaliturina (born 1976), high jumper
Maria Kalmykova (born 1978), basketball player
Yuri Kuleshov (born 1981), professional football defensive midfielder
Irina Meleshina (born 1982), long jumper
Ivan Nifontov (born 1987), judoka
Sergei Panov (born 1970), basketball player
Konstantin Selyavin (born 1974), former Russian professional football player
Kirill Sosunov (born 1975), long jumper
Alexandra Trusova (born 2004), figure skater

Engineering and science
Andrey Arkhangelsky (1879–1940), geologist
Victor Balykin (born 1947), Russian physicist
Vladimir Gulevich (1867–1933), biochemist
Aleksei Kozhevnikov (1836–1902), neurologist and psychiatrist
Nikolai Kravkov (1865–1924), pharmacologist
Sergey P. Kravkov (1873–1938), soil scientist
Sergey V. Kravkov (1893–1951), psychologist and psychophysiologist
Andrey Markov (1856–1922), mathematician
Ivan Michurin (1855–1935), biologist
Sergey Nepobedimy (1921–2014), designer of rocket weaponry
Ivan Pavlov (1849–1936), physiologist
Konstantin Tsiolkovsky (1857–1935), engineer

Others
Dmitry Andreikin (born 1990), chess grandmaster
Roman Putin (born 1977), businessman
Lydia Fotiyeva (1881–1975), Bolshevik revolutionary

Twin towns and sister cities

Ryazan is twinned with:

 Alessandria, Italy
 Bressuire, France
 Brest, Belarus
 Genoa, Italy
 Lovech, Bulgaria
 Münster, Germany
 New Athos, Georgia
 Ostrów Mazowiecka, Poland
 Xuzhou, China

References

Notes

Sources

Further reading

External links
Official website of Ryazan  
Unofficial website of Ryazan 
Unofficial website of Ryazan region 
Photos of Ryazan
Photos of Ryazan 
The Uspensky cathedral (inside the Ryazan kremlin)
Konstantinovo (motherland of the Sergei Yesenin) and other photos.
Photos of historical part of Ryazan

 
Ryazansky Uyezd
Populated places established in the 11th century